Days of Wine and Roses - Live at the Jazz Standard is a live large-ensemble jazz album by the Maria Schneider Orchestra. It was originally released in 2000 as a limited edition sold along with bottles of wine. Subsequently it was re-released by ArtistShare.

, it is the only live album released to have been released by the Maria Schneider Orchestra. All other albums by the ensemble have been studio recorded.

Track listing

Personnel

 Maria Schneider – conductor
 Tim Ries – alto saxophone, soprano saxophone, clarinet, flute,
 Charles Pillow - alto saxophone, soprano saxophone, clarinet, flute
 Rich Perry – tenor saxophone, flute
 Rick Margitza – tenor saxophone, flute
 Scott Robinson – baritone saxophone, bass saxophone, bass clarinet, clarinet, flute
 Tony Kadleck – trumpet, flügelhorn
 Greg Gisbert – trumpet, flügelhorn
 Laurie Frink – trumpet, flügelhorn
 Ingrid Jensen – trumpet, flügelhorn
 Keith O'Quinn – trombone
 Rick Ciccarone – trombone
 Larry Farrell – trombone
 George Flynn – bass trombone, trombone
 Ben Monder – guitar
 Frank Kimbrough - piano
 Tony Scherr - bass
 Tim Horner - drums

References

External links
 Official website

Big band albums
Maria Schneider (musician) albums
Live jazz albums